Ricarda Lang (born 17 January 1994) is a German politician who is serving as co-leader of the Alliance 90/The Greens since January 2022, alongside Omid Nouripour. She has been a member of the Bundestag since 2021. Previously, she was co-deputy leader of the party and spokeswoman for women's policy from 2019 to 2021, and co-leader of the Green Youth from 2017 to 2019.

Early life and education
Lang was raised by a single mother, who was a social worker and worked at a women's shelter. Her father was the sculptor Eckhart Dietz, who died in 2019. After graduating from the Hölderlin-Gymnasium Nürtingen in 2012, Lang began studying law, first at the Heidelberg University and later at the Humboldt University of Berlin, eventually dropping out in 2019 without graduating.

Political career
Lang joined the Green Youth in 2012 at the age of 18. From 2014 to 2015, Lang was speaker for the Campus Greens, the Greens' student association. She was a member of the district executive of the Friedrichshain-Kreuzberg Greens from 2015 to 2016. In October 2015, she became an assessor in the federal board of the Green Youth, and in October 2017 was elected co-spokesperson at the federal congress. In November 2019, she was elected as deputy chairwoman of the Greens and spokeswoman for women's policy.

Lang stood in the 2019 European Parliament election in 25th place on the Greens list, but was not elected. She successfully ran for the Bundestag in the 2021 German federal election in tenth place on the Baden-Württemberg list. She also stood in the Backnang – Schwäbisch Gmünd constituency and placed fifth with 11.5% of votes. She became the first openly bisexual member of the Bundestag. Lang is a member of the Committee for Family, Seniors, Women and Youth and a deputy member of the Committee for Labor and Social Affairs.

In the negotiations to form a coalition government between the SPD, Greens, and FDP following the 2021 federal elections, Lang led her party's delegation in the working group on equality; her co-chairs from the other parties were Petra Köpping (SPD) and Herbert Mertin (FDP).

On 29 January 2022, Lang was elected unopposed at chairwoman of the Greens, along with Omid Nouripour. They succeeded Annalena Baerbock and Robert Habeck, who stepped down after joining the Scholz cabinet.

Political positions
Lang is considered a representative of the left wing of the party. Her main areas of concerns are social justice and climate policy. She also supports feminism, body positivity, and queer politics. She is critical of individualist approaches to policy; for example, to tackle climate change, she opposes focusing on individual consumption and advocates phasing out coal and ending subsidies to environmentally damaging industries. She calls the individualisation of these issues a "ploy to divert attention from the culpability of corporations and political responsibility."

Lang's political goals include an increase in Hartz IV payments, better pay for caregivers, limits on precariat employment, and more support for people living in rural areas. She supports the admission of climate refugees; in particular, she proposes offering EU citizenship to residents of Pacific island nations whose territory is severely threatened by rising sea levels.

Personal life
Lang has lived in Berlin since 2014. She is bisexual, and became the first openly bisexual Bundestag member upon her election in 2021.

References

External links

Living people
1994 births
Bisexual politicians
Female members of the Bundestag
21st-century German women politicians
21st-century German politicians
Members of the Bundestag 2021–2025
Members of the Bundestag for Alliance 90/The Greens
Humboldt University of Berlin alumni
LGBT members of the Bundestag